Julio Alonso Sosa (born 14 December 1998) is a Spanish footballer who plays as a left back for Albacete Balompié.

Club career
Born in Terrassa, Barcelona, Catalonia, Alonso joined Real Betis' youth setup in 2016, after representing CF Damm and UFB Jàbac Terrassa. He made his senior debut with the reserves on 27 August 2017, coming on as a second-half substitute for Redru in a 4–1 Segunda División B away loss against Real Balompédica Linense.

Alonso immediately became a regular starter for the B-team, suffering relegation to Tercera División in his first season but achieving promotion back in his third; he scored his first senior goal for the side on 29 September 2019, netting the B's third in a 4–1 away routing of Córdoba CF B. On 17 June 2021, he signed a two-year contract with Albacete Balompié, freshly relegated to Primera División RFEF.

A first-choice for Alba as the club returned to Segunda División at first attempt, Alonso made his professional debut on 15 August 2022, starting in a 2–1 away win against CD Lugo.

References

External links

1998 births
Living people
Sportspeople from Terrassa
Spanish footballers
Footballers from Catalonia
Association football defenders
Segunda División players
Primera Federación players
Segunda División B players
Tercera División players
Betis Deportivo Balompié footballers
Albacete Balompié players